The Office of Natural Resources Revenue (ONRR) is a unit of the United States Department of the Interior, established by Secretarial Order.  The new office exercises the royalty and revenue management functions formerly under the Minerals Management Service, including royalty and revenue collection, distribution, auditing and compliance, investigation and enforcement, and asset management for both onshore and offshore works.

See also
 Title 30 of the Code of Federal Regulations

References

External links
 Office of Natural Resources Revenue

United States Department of the Interior agencies